Szczawinskia phylicae is a species of crustose lichen in the family Pilocarpaceae. Found in the Tristan da Cunha–Gough Island, it was described as a new species in 2010 by Dag Øvstedal. The type specimen was collected during the Norwegian Tristan da Cunha expedition of 1937–1938.

References

Pilocarpaceae
Lichen species
Lichens described in 2010
Lichens of Tristan da Cunha